John Strickland is a British film and television director.

Some of his credits include The Murder of Princess Diana, Maigret, The Bill, Clocking Off, Trust, P.O.W., Bodies, Hustle, Apparitions, Bedlam, Line of Duty, The Rig and the American series Big Love.

References

External links

British film directors
British television directors
Living people
Place of birth missing (living people)
Year of birth missing (living people)